This is a list of 162 genera in the family Tropiduchidae, tropiduchid planthoppers.

Tropiduchidae genera

References

Tropiduchidae